Hendricus 'Henk' Vogels OAM (1 November 1942 – 9 August 2019) was an Australian cyclist, cycling coach and administrator. He competed in the team pursuit at the 1964 Summer Olympics.

His son, Henk Vogels Jr, is a former Australian cyclist who competed in the individual road race at the 2000 Summer Olympics.

He was awarded the Order of Australia Medal in 2007 for services to cycling. He created the Henk Vogels Cycling Foundation to assist young cyclists in Western Australia.

References

1942 births
2019 deaths
Australian male cyclists
Cyclists at the 1964 Summer Olympics
Dutch emigrants to Australia
Olympic cyclists of Australia
Sportspeople from Haarlem
Australian track cyclists
Cyclists from North Holland
20th-century Australian people
21st-century Australian people